MIK (МИК) is an 8-bit Cyrillic code page used with DOS. It is based on the character set used in the Bulgarian Pravetz 16 IBM PC compatible system. Kermit calls this character set "BULGARIA-PC" / "bulgaria-pc". In Bulgaria, it was sometimes incorrectly referred to as code page 856 (which clashes with IBM's definition for a Hebrew code page). This code page is known by FreeDOS as Code page 3021.

This is the most widespread DOS/OEM code page used in Bulgaria, rather than CP 808, CP 855, CP 866 or CP 872.

Almost every DOS program created in Bulgaria, which has Bulgarian strings in it, was using MIK as encoding, and many such programs are still in use.

Character set
Each character is shown with its equivalent Unicode code point and its decimal code point. Only the second half of the table (code points 128–255) is shown, the first half (code points 0–127) being the same as ASCII.

Notes for implementors of mapping tables to Unicode
Implementors of mapping tables to Unicode should note that the MIK Code page unifies some characters:

Binary character manipulations
The MIK code page maintains in alphabetical order all Cyrillic letters which enables very easy character manipulation in binary form:

10xx xxxx - is a Cyrillic Letter

100x xxxx - is an Upper-case Cyrillic Letter

101x xxxx - is a Lower-case Cyrillic Letter

In such case testing and character manipulating functions as:

IsAlpha(), IsUpper(), IsLower(), ToUpper() and ToLower(),

are bit operations and sorting is by simple comparison of character values.

See also
 Hardware code page

References

External links
 https://www.unicode.org/Public/MAPPINGS/VENDORS/IBM/IBM_conversions.html Unicode Consortium's mappings between IBM's code pages and Unicode
 http://www.cl.cam.ac.uk/~mgk25/unicode.html#conv UTF-8 and Unicode FAQ for Unix/Linux by Markus Kuhn

DOS code pages
Character encoding